Acromantis satsumensis is a species of praying mantis native to Japan.

See also
List of mantis genera and species

References

Satsum
Mantodea of Asia
Endemic fauna of Japan
Insects of Japan
Insects described in 1913
Taxa named by Shōnen Matsumura